Åke Olsson is a retired Swedish footballer. Olsson was part of the Djurgården Swedish champions' team of 1954-55. Olsson made 63 Allsvenskan appearances for Djurgården and scored 1 goals.

Honours

Club 
 Djurgårdens IF 
 Allsvenskan: 1954–55

References

Swedish footballers
Allsvenskan players
Djurgårdens IF Fotboll players
Association football defenders